Ekai (Ekai Chin) is a Kuki-Chin language of Burma. It was formerly classified as a dialect of Laitu due to acquired bilingualism.

References

Kuki-Chin languages